The following is a list of Port Adelaide Football Club leading goalkickers in each season of its history, including its time in the South Australian National Football League (SANFL) and the Australian Football League (AFL).

Leading goalkickers

Multiple leading goalkickers

Leading career goal-kickers for Port Adelaide

References
General

 

Specific

Goalkickers
Australian rules football-related lists